is a beat 'em up video game released for the PC Engine in 1989, developed by Face Corporation. It has a sequel called Cross Wiber.

Reception
Computer and Video Games reviewed the game, giving it an 80% rating.

Notes

References

External links

1989 video games
Beat 'em ups
Face (company) games
Superhero video games
TurboGrafx-16 games
TurboGrafx-16-only games
Video games about police officers
Video games developed in Japan
Single-player video games